Very Nice Day is a Canadian thriller drama film, directed by Patrice Laliberté and released in 2022. The film stars Guillaume Laurin as Jérémie, a bicycle courier and conspiracy theory podcaster in Montreal; when Élyane (Sarah-Jeanne Labrosse), a social media influencer, moves in next door to him, he becomes obsessed with her and misses a delivery job, leading his boss Dom (Marc Beaupré) to launch a manhunt to find him.

The cast also includes  Marc-André Grondin, Christine Beaulieu, Mathieu Dufresne and Sandrine Bisson.

The film opened theatrically on May 6, 2022.

References

External links 
 

2022 films
2022 thriller films
Canadian thriller drama films
Films shot in Quebec
Films set in Quebec
Films directed by Patrice Laliberté
French-language Canadian films
2020s Canadian films